The following is a list of United States cities of 100,000+ inhabitants with the 50 highest rates of public transit commuting to work, according to data from the 2015 American Community Survey. The survey measured the percentage of commuters who take public transit, as opposed to walking, driving or riding in an automobile, bicycle, boat, or some other means.

1. New York City, New York – 56.5%

2. Jersey City, New Jersey – 47.6%

3. Washington, D.C. – 37.4%

4. Boston, Massachusetts – 33.7%

5. San Francisco, California – 33.1%

6. Cambridge, Massachusetts – 28.6%

7. Chicago, Illinois – 27.6%

8. Newark, New Jersey – 26.7%

9. Arlington, Virginia – 26.4%

10. Yonkers, New York – 26.4%

11. Philadelphia, Pennsylvania – 26.2%

12. Alexandria, Virginia – 21.7%

13. Berkeley, California – 21.6%

14. Oakland, California – 20.3%

15. Seattle, Washington – 20.1%

16. Daly City, California – 19.8%

17. Baltimore, Maryland – 18.6%

18. Pittsburgh, Pennsylvania – 17.0%

19. Hartford, Connecticut – 16.6%

20. Stamford, Connecticut – 14.1%

21. Richmond, California – 14.0%

22. Edison, New Jersey – 13.4%

23. New Haven, Connecticut – 13.3%

24. Minneapolis, Minnesota – 13.1%

25. Portland, Oregon – 12.1%

26. Paterson, New Jersey – 11.9%

27. Bellevue, Washington – 11.8%

28. Buffalo, New York – 11.7%

29. Miami, Florida – 11.4%

30. Elizabeth, New Jersey – 11.3%

31. Ann Arbor, Michigan – 11.2%

32. East Los Angeles, California – 10.9%

33. Bridgeport, Connecticut – 10.8%

34. Cleveland, Ohio – 10.5%

35. Los Angeles, California – 10.6%

36. Concord, California – 10.0%

37. Atlanta, Georgia – 9.8%

38. Naperville, Illinois – 9.7%

39. St. Louis, Missouri – 9.4%

40. Madison, Wisconsin – 9.3%

41. Fremont, California – 9.0%

42. Rochester, New York – 8.8%

43. San Juan, Puerto Rico – 8.7%

44. Milwaukee, Wisconsin – 8.6%

45. St. Paul, Minnesota – 8.5%

46. Honolulu, Hawaii – 8.4%

47. Providence, Rhode Island – 8.3%

48. Gresham, Oregon – 8.2%

49. Cincinnati, Ohio – 7.8%

50. New Orleans, Louisiana – 7.8%

See also
List of U.S. cities with most pedestrian commuters
List of U.S. cities with most bicycle commuters
Transportation in the United States
List of United States rapid transit systems by ridership
List of United States light rail systems by ridership
List of United States local bus agencies by ridership
List of United States commuter rail systems by ridership
Modal share

Sources
2015 American Community Survey 5-year estimates
US Census
Carfree Census Database
American Public Transportation Association Ridership Report

Cities with high transit ridership
Transportation in the United States
Public transportation in the United States
Transit ridership